Djalma Pereira Dias dos Santos known simply as Djalma Santos (also spelled Dejalma Santos), (27 February 192923 July 2013) was a Brazilian footballer who started for the Brazil national team in four World Cups, winning two, in 1958 and 1962. Santos is considered to be one of the greatest right-backs of all time. While primarily known for his defensive skills, he often ventured upfield and displayed some impressive technical and attacking skills.

Along with Franz Beckenbauer and Philipp Lahm, he is one of only three players to be included into three FIFA World Cup All Star teams (in 1954, 1958 and 1962). He was unrelated to his frequent defensive partner Nilton Santos. He was named by Pelé as one of the top 125 greatest living footballers in March 2004. He is also one of the few footballers to have made over 1,000 professional appearances in his career.

Djalma Santos made history in the three big clubs he played for. Djalma was an idol at Palmeiras, where he played 498 games for nine years and won several titles, at Portuguesa, where he emerged in professional football and played 510 games, and at Atlético Paranaense, where he ended his career. Known as an exemplary player, he was never sent-off from the field.

Club career 
Djalma Santos started his career in his hometown with Portuguesa. He initially played in the centre of defence, but was later moved to the right side of defense. He was part of one of the best Portuguesa teams of all time, where alongside players like Pinga, Julinho Botelho and Brandãozinho he won the Rio-São Paulo Tournament in 1952 and 1955 and the Blue Ribbon in 1951 and 1953. He is the second largest record holder of games played by the club, 434 in total, between the years 1949 and 1958, second only to Capitão, with 496 games.

At Palmeiras, with 498 games, he is the seventh player who wore most the "alviverde" {Green and White} jersey. He was featured in the first academy alongside stars such as Ademir da Guia, Julinho Botelho, Djalma Dias and Vavá. It was at Palmeiras that he won the greatest number of titles of his career: the Paulista Championship in 1959, 1963 and 1966; the Brazilian Championships of 1960, 1967 (Robertão) and Brazil Cup of 1967. In addition, he won the Rio-São Paulo Tournament in 1965.

For Atlético Paranaense he played until the age of 42, another unusual brand for soccer players.

Despite having only defended three clubs in his career, Djalma Santos once wore the jersey of São Paulo, even though he belonged to Palmeiras at the time. On November 9, 1960, he played as an honor guest in the celebrations of the inauguration of the Morumbi Stadium, in the victory over Nacional do Uruguay, by 3–0, with goals from Canhoteiro and Gino.

International career 

Santos made 98 official appearances for Brazil between 1952 and 1968, and was in the squad for four consecutive World Cups between 1954 and 1966. He made his first appearance against Peru in the Panamerican Championship. The match was drawn 0–0. He also made two unofficial appearances for Brazil.

1954 World Cup 
Santos made his World Cup debut in a 5–0 win against Mexico, and played in all of Brazil's matches during the tournament. He scored his first goal for Brazil from the penalty spot in a 4–2 defeat against Hungary (also known as the "Battle of Berne").

1958 World Cup 
Santos had lost his place in the side after being dropped in favour of De Sordi, and did not play until the final against Sweden. Brazil won the match 5–2, with Santos being one of the outstanding performers. As a result, despite only playing one match in the tournament, he was included in the tournament's All-Star Team.

1962 World Cup 
Santos was once again a regular in the starting lineup, playing in all of Brazil's games. In the final against Czechoslovakia he set up the final goal for Brazil. Noting that the Slovak goalkeeper Viliam Schrojf was somewhat off his line, Santos lofted a long, massive, high arcing ball, into the goalmouth aided by the glare of the afternoon sun. Schrojf mishandled the cross, and Brazilian striker Vavá hammered the ball into goal.

1966 World Cup 
Santos, now at the age of 37, was selected for a fourth consecutive World Cup. The inclusion of Santos in the squad was a surprise to some, with Carlos Alberto expected to be selected instead. Santos played the first two games, but was dropped after the 3–1 defeat to Hungary. Brazil were knocked out of the tournament in the next game against Portugal.

Style of play 
After beginning his career in midfield, Santos found much success as a defender due to his composure, as well as his excellent and consistent displays in this position, and is regarded as one of the greatest right-backs of all time; he was also capable of playing as a centre back. Santos was a quick and physically strong defender, who was known for his stamina, marking, and tackling ability; he was also effective in the air. In addition to his defensive ability as a right-back, which earned him the nickname Muralha (the wall) from the Uruguayan writer Eduardo Galeano, Santos was also known for his excellent technique and offensive capabilities, which saw him contribute to the development of the role; being gifted with excellent ball control, good dribbling skills, creativity, and accurate distribution, he often took on opponents with the ball when under pressure in one on one situations, even in risky situations inside his own penalty area, and he was also one of the first full-backs to venture forward and make overlapping attacking runs down the flank in order to contribute to his teams' offensive plays. Santos was also an accurate penalty kick and set-piece taker, and was known for his ability to take long throw-ins. In addition to his ability as a footballer, Santos was also known to be an extremely fair and correct player, as well as an exemplary professional, who stood out for his work-rate, longevity, discipline in training, and correct behaviour; throughout his entire, extensive career, he was never once sent off.

Death 
Santos died on 23 July 2013 in hospital in Uberaba, where he had lived for two decades. He died due to pneumonia and severe hemodynamic instability, culminating with cardiac arrest, having been hospitalized since 1 July 2013.

Honours 
Portuguesa
Torneio Rio – São Paulo: 1952, 1955
Fita Azul Internacional: 1951, 1953 e 1954

Palmeiras
Campeonato Paulista: 1959, 1963, 1966
Campeonato Brasileiro Série A: 1960, 1967  (Torneio Roberto Gomes Pedrosa), 1967 (Taça Brasil)
Torneio Rio – São Paulo: 1965

Brazil
FIFA World Cup: 1958, 1962
Panamerican Championship: 1952
Roca Cup: 1957, 1960, 1963
Copa Río Branco: 1968
Taça Oswaldo Cruz: 1955, 1956, 1962
Taça Bernado O'Higgins: 1959

Individual
FIFA World Cup All-Star Team: 1954, 1958, 1962
World Soccer World XI: 1962, 1963, 1965
FIFA XI: 1963
FIFA World Cup All-Time Team: 1994
FIFA 100
The Best of The Best – Player of the Century: Top 50
Brazilian Football Museum Hall of Fame

References

External links 
RSSSF complete stats on international appearances
Brazilian Football Confederation profile (in Portuguese)
Djalma Santos bio
Djalma Santos Palmeiras career (in Portuguese)

1929 births
2013 deaths
FIFA 100
Brazilian footballers
Footballers from São Paulo
Club Athletico Paranaense players
Associação Portuguesa de Desportos players
Sociedade Esportiva Palmeiras players
1954 FIFA World Cup players
1958 FIFA World Cup players
1962 FIFA World Cup players
1966 FIFA World Cup players
FIFA World Cup-winning players
Brazil international footballers
Deaths from pneumonia in Minas Gerais
Association football defenders